Cermoño is one of 28 parishes (administrative divisions) in Salas, a municipality within the province and autonomous community of Asturias, in northern Spain.

Villages
Ballota (Vallouta) 
Borreras 
Cermoño (Cermoñu) 
Cortes 
La Planadera 
Nava 
Ovanes (Ouvanes) 
Valbona

References

Parishes in Salas